Triebes is a suburb of Zeulenroda-Triebes in Thuringia, Germany.

History
Triebes was mentioned in a document the first time in 1209.

Within the German Empire (1871-1918), Triebes was part or the Principality of Reuss-Gera.

In 2006 Triebes merged with Zeulenroda.

Towns in Thuringia
Principality of Reuss-Gera